Franco Daniel Amoroso (born 4 January 1994 in Buenos Aires) is an Argentine footballer who plays as a midfielder.

Club career
Amoroso graduated from Club Tijuana's youth system, but left the club in January 2011, signing an 18-month contract with Xerez CD.

On 18 May 2013, Amoroso made his debut for the first team, in a 0–2 home defeat against Sporting de Gijón. On 8 June, in his only second appearance with the main squad, Amoroso scored his first goal in "silver category", in a 2–1 home win against FC Barcelona B.

References

External links

1994 births
Living people
Footballers from Buenos Aires
Argentine footballers
Argentine expatriate footballers
Association football midfielders
Segunda División players
Xerez CD footballers
Rangers de Talca footballers
Expatriate footballers in Chile
Expatriate footballers in Spain
Argentine expatriate sportspeople in Chile
Argentine expatriate sportspeople in Spain